is a railway station in Isahaya, Nagasaki Prefecture, Japan. It is operated by JR Kyushu and is on the Nagasaki Main Line.

Lines

Station layout 
The station consists of an island platform serving two tracks at grade. The station structure is no more than a roof for steps down to an underpass leading to the island platform. A ticket window is integrated into the structure but is however unstaffed.

Adjacent stations

History
Ichinuno was opened on the same day as one of the intermediate stations along this new route. With the privatization of JNR on 1 April 1987, control of the station passed to JR Kyushu.

Passenger statistics
In fiscal 2014, there were a total of 105,307 boarding passengers, giving a daily average of 289 passengers.

Environs
Route 34
Nagasaki Expressway, Nagasaki Bypass: Nagasaki-Tarami Interchange
Nagasaki Bypass: Koga-Ichinuno Interchange

References

External links
Ichinuno Station (JR Kyushu)

Railway stations in Nagasaki Prefecture
Nagasaki Main Line
Railway stations in Japan opened in 1972